Joseph Demers (November 11, 1861 – August 16, 1936) was a Canadian politician in the province of Quebec.

Born in Sainte-Julie (Laurierville), Canada East, the son of Édouard Demers and Olympe Rousseau, Demers was educated in Sainte-Julie. He started clerking in 1877 until 1883 when he opened a general store in Thetford Mines. He was a councillor from 1890 till 1893, mayor from 1893 to 1895, and alderman from 1903 to 1905. He was first elected to the Legislative Assembly of Quebec for the electoral district of Mégantic in the 1912 election. A Liberal, he did not run in the 1916 election.

References
 
 

1861 births
1936 deaths
Mayors of places in Quebec
Quebec Liberal Party MNAs